Fábio Ferreira da Silva (born 23 October 1984 in Campina Grande), known as Fábio Ferreira, is a Brazilian footballer who plays for Ponte Preta as a central defender.

Honours
Corinthians
Campeonato Brasileiro Série A: 2005
Campeonato Brasileiro Série B: 2008

Botafogo
Taça Guanabara: 2010
Taça Rio: 2010, 2012
Campeonato Carioca: 2010

Criciúma
Campeonato Catarinense: 2013

External links

1984 births
Living people
People from 	Campina Grande
Brazilian footballers
Association football central defenders
Campeonato Brasileiro Série A players
Campeonato Brasileiro Série B players
Sport Club Corinthians Paulista players
Grêmio Foot-Ball Porto Alegrense players
Esporte Clube Vitória players
Esporte Clube Noroeste players
Esporte Clube Juventude players
Botafogo de Futebol e Regatas players
Criciúma Esporte Clube players
Associação Atlética Ponte Preta players